The 1972 United States presidential election in Florida was held on November 7, 1972, as part of the concurrent United States presidential election. Florida voters chose seventeen electors, or representatives to the Electoral College, who voted for president and vice president.

After having been among the strongest parts of the Democratic "Solid South" between 1892 and 1944 – except when vehement pineywoods anti-Catholicism and extensive urban Republican voting gave the state's electoral votes to Herbert Hoover in 1928 – Florida turned into a Republican-leaning state at presidential level from 1948 due to the growth of a strongly business-oriented society in newer South Florida following World War II. Aided by this vote, the Republicans carried Florida in all three presidential elections from 1952 to 1960, despite losing the entire northern half of the state.

The civil rights movement of the 1960s saw a dramatic change in the next two elections. The classically Deep Southern northern part of the state, affected by turmoil over school and university desegregation, went powerfully to the staunchly conservative Republican Barry Goldwater after having resisted the GOP in the previous four elections, and then turned to the segregationist candidacy of former and future Alabama Governor George Wallace in 1968. Contrastingly, the southern urban areas that had supported the Republicans between 1948 and 1960 contained huge numbers of former Northern retirees hostile to Goldwater's proposed privatization of Social Security, and turned to Lyndon Johnson and then Richard Nixon.

The 1972 Democratic presidential primary in Florida saw Wallace easily carry the state and every county bar Dade, in a ballot that also featured a referendum on court-ordered busing. This referendum revealed that more three-fourths of the state's voters supported a constitutional ban on busing. The party primaries that year were especially divisive over the busing issue. John Lindsay, plus eventual party nominee George McGovern were supporters of busing who accused even their moderate rivals Hubert Humphrey and "Scoop" Jackson of being covert racists for their opposition thereto. As it turned out, Wallace – the opponent most feared by Nixon – was paralyzed by an attempted assassination in May, and McGovern won the nomination via powerful support in midwestern and Pacific States.

Once McGovern won the nomination, he offered Florida Governor Reubin Askew the vice-presidential slot, but Askew turned the position down.

As of 2020, Nixon is the only Republican to ever sweep all of Florida's counties in a presidential election.

Primary elections

Democratic 
George Wallace would win a majority of the Democratic Primary vote in all of the counties in the state.

Republican 
Richard Nixon would end up winning a majority of the vote in all counties except for Desoto County.

Vote
Incumbent President Nixon overwhelmingly won the state of Florida with 71.91% of the vote, carrying all of Florida's 67 counties (the last time any presidential candidate has won every single county in the state) and seventeen electoral votes. This made Florida about 21% more Republican than the nation-at-large. Nixon's victory in Florida made it his fifth strongest state after Mississippi, Georgia, Oklahoma and Alabama. McGovern reached 40% of the vote only in Dade County with its substantial Jewish and Latin populations, plus Alachua County with its large population of liberal college students who were a major base for his candidacy – and the Democratic candidate only reached thirty percent of the vote in four other counties. Nixon's message enabled him to capture virtually all of the Wallace vote from 1968, as shown by the fact that pineywoods Holmes County, which had been Wallace's fifth-strongest county in 1968, was to be Nixon's fourth-best county in 1972 with over 92% of the vote. Despite this, McGovern did improve upon Humphrey's vote share in 13 counties, all but two of which had voted for Wallace in 1968. 

In addition to hostility towards busing and the "acid, amnesty and abortion" policies which Nixon consistently accused McGovern of despite eventual running mate Sargent Shriver being firmly opposed to abortion, the Democratic campaign in Florida was also crippled by McGovern's policy of normalizing relationships with Fidel Castro's Cuba. Relationships with Cuba were a hotbed issue in the most liberal and least Southern region of the state around Miami, and drove even many voters who had supported Humphrey in 1968 to Nixon and the Republican Party. This allowed the GOP to carry Monroe County, which had consistently voted Democratic since 1888, by over 45%. This was also the first time ever that the North Florida counties of Bradford, Gilchrist, Hamilton, Levy, and Union voted Republican. All five of these counties gave Nixon over 70% of the vote and Gilchrist and Union, which had never voted Republican up to this point and only once had given a Republican even 25% of the vote, both gave Nixon over 80% of the vote.

, this is the last election in which Gadsden County voted for a Republican presidential candidate.

Results

Results by county

References 

1972 Florida elections
1972
Florida